The canton of Lemberg is a former canton of France, located in the Moselle department. It was created in 1790 and disbanded in 1802.

Its municipalities are today all part of the canton of Bitche.

 Althorn
 Enchenberg
 Goetzenbruck
 Holbach
 Lambach
 Lemberg (with Saint-Louis)
 Meisenthal
 Montbronn
 Mouterhouse
 Sarreinsberg
 Siersthal
 Soucht

See also
Cantons of the Moselle department
Communes of the Moselle department

References

Lemberg